The Mississippi is an American legal drama television series which ran for 2 seasons from 1983 to 1984 on CBS. The series consisted of 24 episodes: 1 pilot, 6 first-season episodes and 17 episodes in the second season. The series was written by Aubrey Solomon and starred Ralph Waite, Linda Miller, and Stan Shaw.

Plot
Ralph Waite played Ben Walker, a successful criminal attorney who, after retiring his law practice, sought a simpler life on the Mississippi River as the captain of a stern wheel river boat. Conflicting with his desire for an easy retirement from legal practice, he'd find at every port someone who needed a good attorney, and he would end up defending him or her. His “crew” consisted of Stella McMullen and Lafayette 'Lafe' Tate, both of whom were more interested in helping people, fighting crime, and becoming attorneys than in running the tug.

Filming occurred in several cities along the Mississippi River including Natchez, Mississippi, and Memphis, Tennessee.

Cast
Ralph Waite as Ben Walker
Linda Miller as Stella McMullen
Stan Shaw as Lafayette "Lafe" Tate

Episodes

Season 1: 1982–83

Season 2: 1983–84

US television ratings

Awards
The episode "Old Hatreds Die Hard" was nominated for a 1983 Primetime Emmy Award for Outstanding Directing for a Drama Series.

References

External links
 
 The Mississippi at The Classic TV Archive

1983 American television series debuts
1984 American television series endings
1980s American drama television series
1980s American legal television series
CBS original programming
Television shows set in Mississippi
Television shows set in Tennessee
Television series by Warner Bros. Television Studios
Works about the Mississippi River